Vandenberg Village is a census-designated place (CDP) in the unincorporated area of Santa Barbara County, California, United States. The population was 6,497 at the 2010 census, up from 5,802 at the 2000 census.

It is a community situated in the hills north of Lompoc, California. 
While shops and markets can be found in Vandenberg Village, many residents commute to nearby Lompoc on a daily basis.

It is close to Vandenberg Space Force Base.

Geography

Vandenberg Village is the location of Cabrillo High School (one of two general high schools located within Lompoc Unified School District boundaries), Buena Vista Elementary School, and Maple High (Continuation) School.

Surrounding the village is the Burton Mesa Ecological Reserve, and north of that the Lompoc Oil Field follows the line of the Purisima Hills.

Services
Water and Wastewater services are provided by Vandenberg Village Community Services District.
Electricity services are provided by Pacific Gas and Electric.
Library services are provided by the Lompoc Public Library System.
It is served by Lompoc School District, which ranks in the top 20 percent of schools in California.

Demographics

2010
The 2010 United States Census reported that Vandenberg Village had a population of 6,497. The racial makeup of Vandenberg Village was 5,029 (77.4%) White, 271 (4.2%) African American, 60 (0.9%) Native American, 323 (5.0%) Asian, 58 (0.9%) Pacific Islander, 432 (6.6%) from other races, and 324 (5.0%) from two or more races. Hispanic or Latino of any race were 1,216 persons (18.7%).

The Census reported that 6,478 people (99.7% of the population) lived in households, 15 (0.2%) lived in non-institutionalized group quarters, and 4 (0.1%) were institutionalized.

There were 2,551 households, out of which 770 (30.2%) had children under the age of 18 living in them, 1,486 (58.3%) were opposite-sex married couples living together, 237 (9.3%) had a female householder with no husband present, 114 (4.5%) had a male householder with no wife present.  There were 86 (3.4%) unmarried opposite-sex partnerships, and 11 (0.4%) same-sex married couples or partnerships. 597 households (23.4%) were made up of individuals, and 360 (14.1%) had someone living alone who was 65 years of age or older. The average household size was 2.54.  There were 1,837 families (72.0% of all households); the average family size was 2.99.

The population was spread out, with 1,467 people (22.6%) under the age of 18, 473 people (7.3%) aged 18 to 24, 1,304 people (20.1%) aged 25 to 44, 1,917 people (29.5%) aged 45 to 64, and 1,336 people (20.6%) who were 65 years of age or older.  The median age was 45.0 years. For every 100 females, there were 96.0 males.  For every 100 females age 18 and over, there were 92.1 males.

The homeowner vacancy rate was 2.1%; the rental vacancy rate was 6.1%.  4,968 people (76.5% of the population) lived in owner-occupied housing units and 1,510 people (23.2%) lived in rental housing units.

2000
As of the census of 2000, there were 5,802 people, 2,304 households, and 1,737 families residing in the CDP. The racial makeup of the CDP was 84.54% White, 5.60% African American, 1.02% Native American, 3.00% Asian, 0.17% Pacific Islander, 2.67% from other races, and 3.00% from two or more races. Hispanic or Latino of any race were 8.88% of the population.

There were 2,304 households, out of which 25.3% had children under the age of 18 living with them, 64.8% were married couples living together, 7.8% had a female householder with no husband present, and 24.6% were non-families. 20.9% of all households were made up of individuals, and 11.5% had someone living alone who was 65 years of age or older.  The average household size was 2.49 and the average family size was 2.86.

In the CDP, the population was spread out, with 22.0% under the age of 18, 5.2% from 18 to 24, 22.7% from 25 to 44, 25.9% from 45 to 64, and 24.3% who were 65 years of age or older.  The median age was 45 years. For every 100 females, there were 94.0 males.  For every 100 females age 18 and over, there were 89.4 males.

The median income for a household in the CDP was $58,700, and the median income for a family was $66,122. Males had a median income of $50,362 versus $27,969 for females. The per capita income for the CDP was $29,838.  About 3.8% of families and 4.8% of the population were below the poverty line, including 4.3% of those under age 18 and 3.8% of those age 65 or over.

See also
 Rancho Ex-Mission la Purisima

References

External links
 Vandenberg Village Community Services District website
 Pacific Gas and Electric website
 Lompoc Public Library website

Census-designated places in Santa Barbara County, California
Census-designated places in California